M. Mani Achiyur was an Indian politician and former Member of the Legislative Assembly. He was elected to the Tamil Nadu legislative assembly as a Dravida Munnetra Kazhagam candidate from Nanguneri constituency in 1989 election.

References 

Dravida Munnetra Kazhagam politicians
Living people
Year of birth missing (living people)